Pierre Dréossi (born 12 October 1959) is a French football manager and former player.

He played as a defender for Lille OSC, FC Sochaux-Montbéliard, OGC Nice, Paris Saint-Germain and AS Cannes.

He was head coach of Stade Rennais until he resigned on 16 December 2007, after a 2–1 defeat against SM Caen.

He recently was the general manager of Panathinaikos.

References

Living people
1959 births
French footballers
Association football defenders
Lille OSC players
FC Sochaux-Montbéliard players
OGC Nice players
Paris Saint-Germain F.C. players
AS Cannes players
Ligue 1 players
Ligue 2 players
French football managers
Ligue 1 managers
Stade Rennais F.C. managers
French expatriate sportspeople in Greece